The 2000–01 season was the 77th season in the existence of AEK Athens F.C. and the 42nd consecutive season in the top flight of Greek football. They competed in the Alpha Ethniki, the Greek Cup and the UEFA Cup. The season began on 6 August 2000 and finished on 26 May 2001.

Overview

The season started with the multinational Netmed and ENIC at the wheel and with Cornelius Sierhuis and Petros Stathis in command. Giannis Pathiakakis, having made a very good finish in the previous season, took charge of the club's transfers, having a pretty good budget. Pathiakakis after a transfer journey in Latin America bringing Fernando Navas, Emanuel Ruiz and Ferrugem to the team, but the transfer "bombs" occurred with Greek footballers. Vasilios Tsiartas returned from Sevilla after 4 years, while Theodoros Zagorakis returned from England to wear the colors of AEK Athens.

In the championship, AEK started mediocre, but the psychology went up in the European matches with the qualification against Bayer Leverkusen. The first problems, however, started with the 4–1 defeat from Olympiacos for the championship and in fact AEK eventually fell psychologically later, in the cup matches and the elimination by Olympiacos in the Round of 16. Pathiakakis left AEK after those specific matches, Toni Savevski retired as a footballer and "overnight" he became the coach of the team as a "duo" with Eugène Gerards, however AEK did not manage to save many things from the season, as they finished in third place, 17 points from the top.

In the Greek cup, AEK initially played in a group with Panathinaikos, AEL, Ethnikos Piraeus, Kozani and Olympiacos Volos and passed as second behind Panathinaikos in the next round, where it were drawn against Olympiacos. The first match took place in Nea Filadelfeia, where AEK entered the match well and took the lead with Nikolaidis. However, in a tackle by Zikos, where ended up to Nikolaidis, went to score another goal, the referee whistled for a foul. Zikos protested and the referee sent him off with a second yellow. In the midst of chaos that followed the referee expelled Nikolaidis as well with a straight red. AEK with 9 men, were equalized and as the heated crowd in the stands were angrier, Petros Stathis made a decision that would mark the history of the club and after whispering to Pathiakakis, 3 players of AEK fell down pretending to be wounded. The AEK ultras broke the railings of the roof and invade the pitch and as a result the match was suspended with the red and whites winning by 2–0 without a match. In the rematch Pathiakakis made a confusing decision, using a mixture of substitutes and main players in the lineup in another nightmare evening for AEK, where the match ended in a 6–1 defeat.

In the first round of the UEFA Cup, AEK were drawn against Hungarian Vasas. In the first match at Ferenc Puskás Stadium, AEK appeared sluggish, but at the start of the second half, they woke up and quickly scored 2 goals, while later the laziness returned with the result of beeing equalizing with 2 goals in the last minutes of the match. In rematch of Nikos Goumas Stadium AEK appeared more serious and with Maladenis, who was the protagonist of the match, scored a goal in the 27th minute and two minutes later, won a penalty scored by Nikolaidis, with the 2–0 being the final score. The next opponent for the yellow-blacks was Herfølge from Denmark. First match in Athens, where the amazing Nikolaidis scored an impresive of 4 of goals and Zikos scored another goal with a nice shot and AEK achieved an emphatic victory. In the repmatch, the Danes took the lead from very early on with AEK equalizing. In the second half, Herfølge again took the lead with a penalty and the match ended with an unacceptable defeat for the Greek club. In the round of 32, the difficult times came for AEK, who were drawn with the German Bayer Leverkusen, were in the top of the Bundesliga at that time. The first match at the BayArena, where in a historic night for the Greek team, AEK took the lead early on, but then conceded 2 goals. However, AEK pressed and equalized, but before the celebrations were stopped, Bayer made it 3–2 with the yellow-blacks equalizing with a penalty. In the 79th minute, AEK made it 3–4 and while the Germans continued to press hard eventually AEK's defense hold  again, conceding a goal at the end of the game which ended in the impressive 4–4. The rematch of Nikos Goumas on 7th December was an even more impressive night for AEK who scored near the beginning of the match, while in the second half they doubled their lead with a direct free kick and achieved a huge qualification win, which was one of the important in their European history. In the round of 16, things became even more difficult since AEK were drawn with the great Barcelona of Rivaldo, Kluivert, Overmars, Luis Enrique, Guardiola and De Boer. In the first leg at Nea Filadelfeia in a fantastic atmosphere, AEK stood up well, but a mistake by the yellow-black defense in the 42nd was enough for the Spanish team to open the score, where it remained until the end of the match and their few hopes of qualification they seemed to fly away. In the rematch at Camp Nou, the Greek club entered strongly, but Barcelona did not panic and crushed the yellow-blacks with a wide score of 5–0. AEK Athens' European run ended with elimination by the mighty Spanish team.

Players

Squad information

NOTE: The players are the ones that have been announced by the AEK Athens' press release. No edits should be made unless a player arrival or exit is announced. Updated 30 June 2001, 23:59 UTC+3.

Transfers

In

Summer

 a.  On 28 December 2001 FIFA awarded Palmeiras the fee of ₯650,000,000, as compensation, due to the player's free transfer upon his contract's expiration.

Winter

Out

Summer

Winter

Loan in

Winter

Loan out

Summer

Winter

Renewals

Overall transfer activity

Expenditure
Summer:  ₯2,950,000,000

Winter:  ₯300,000,000

Total:  ₯3,250,000,000

Income
Summer:  ₯0

Winter:  ₯0

Total:  ₯0

Net Totals
Summer:  ₯2,950,000,000

Winter:  ₯300,000,000

Total:  ₯3,250,000,000

Pre-season and friendlies

Alpha Ethniki

League table

Results summary

Results by Matchday

Fixtures

Greek Cup

First round

Group 6

Matches

Round of 16

UEFA Cup

First round

Second round

Third round

Fourth round

Statistics

Squad statistics

! colspan="13" style="background:#FFDE00; text-align:center" | Goalkeepers
|-

! colspan="13" style="background:#FFDE00; color:black; text-align:center;"| Defenders
|-

! colspan="13" style="background:#FFDE00; color:black; text-align:center;"| Midfielders
|-

! colspan="13" style="background:#FFDE00; color:black; text-align:center;"| Forwards
|-

! colspan="13" style="background:#FFDE00; color:black; text-align:center;"| Left during Winter Transfer Window
|-

|-
|}

Disciplinary record

|-
! colspan="17" style="background:#FFDE00; text-align:center" | Goalkeepers

|-
! colspan="17" style="background:#FFDE00; color:black; text-align:center;"| Defenders

|-
! colspan="17" style="background:#FFDE00; color:black; text-align:center;"| Midfielders

|-
! colspan="17" style="background:#FFDE00; color:black; text-align:center;"| Forwards

|-
! colspan="17" style="background:#FFDE00; color:black; text-align:center;"| Left during Winter Transfer window

|-
|}

Starting 11

References

External links
AEK Athens F.C. Official Website

2000-01
Greek football clubs 2000–01 season